The Dream is the second studio album by American country musician Hailey Whitters. It was released on February 28, 2020 under her own label, Pigasus Records.

Accolades

Commercial performance
The album sold 300 copies in the US in its first week.

Track listing

References

2020 albums